Route 836, or Highway 836, may refer to:

Canada
Alberta Highway 836

United Kingdom
 A836 road

United States